The following is a list of public holidays in the Republic of Artsakh:

See also
Public holidays in Armenia

References

Public holidays in the Republic of Artsakh
Nagorno-Karabakh Republic